Tiergarten Walding (literally, “Walding Zoo”), is a small zoo located on a hill in the village of Walding, in the district of Urfahr-Umgebung in the Austrian state of Upper Austria.

Founded in 1967 as a smaller Animal shelter at a farm and Gasthaus in Pasching southwest of Linz, the owners moved the animals to a new location in Walding in 1973, and was granted zoo licence in 1979. Among other species can be seen Gibbon, Leopard, Lion, Ozelot, Zebra, Serval, Tiger.

References

External links

Zoos in Austria
Zoos established in 1979